Peter Jimmy Carter Ongondo (born 10 February 1977) is a former Kenyan cricketer. He is a right-handed batman and a right-arm medium-fast bowler.

In 2012, Ongondo was appointed for the coaching staff of Kenya team.

Domestic career
In 2008 Ongondo was selected as captain of the team the Western Chiefs in Kenya's newly formed domestic competition the Sahara Elite League.

Ongondo moved to Chesham Cricket Club in England in 2010 and following his excellent performances on the pitch and his incredible work rate off the pitch he returned for another season in 2011. Due to problems in obtaining a Visa, Ongondo was unable to return in 2012 but helped to recommend the club's next overseas player, Nehemiah Odhiambo.

International career
Having represented Kenya in 1999-2000, he had to wait two years for his next appearance, where he made a commendable 36* as the number 11 batsman. Ongondo has been a regular fixture for the Kenyan team ever since.

References

External links
 
 

1977 births
Living people
Cricketers from Nairobi
Kenyan cricketers
Kenya One Day International cricketers
Kenya Twenty20 International cricketers
Western Chiefs cricketers
ACA African XI One Day International cricketers
Cricketers at the 2003 Cricket World Cup
Cricketers at the 2007 Cricket World Cup
Cricketers at the 2011 Cricket World Cup
Kenyan cricket coaches